Tera Kya Hoga Lovely is an upcoming Indian Hindi-language social comedy film directed by Balwinder Singh Janjua and produced by Sony Pictures Films India. The film features Randeep Hooda and Ileana D'Cruz in the lead roles. The film is about to explore India's obsession with fair skin.

Cast
 Randeep Hooda as Lovely 
 Ileana D'Cruz
 Karan Kundrra

Production
The principal photography commenced on 29 October 2020 in Haryana. The film was wrapped up on 19 November 2020.

References

External links 
 

Upcoming films
Upcoming Hindi-language films
Films shot in Haryana
Indian comedy films
Unreleased Hindi-language films
Sony Pictures films
Columbia Pictures films
Sony Pictures Networks India films